Azastene (INN, USAN) (developmental code name WIN-17625) is a steroidogenesis inhibitor described as a contraceptive, luteolytic, and abortifacient which was never marketed. It acts as a competitive inhibitor of 3β-hydroxysteroid dehydrogenase (IC50 = 1 μM), and thereby inhibiting the formation of progesterone, corticosteroids, androgens, and estrogens. Due to inhibition of corticosteroid synthesis, azastene is immunosuppressive.

Synthesis

One synthesis of this compound involves initial alkylation of methyl testosterone by means of strong base and methyl iodide to afford the 4,4-dimethyl derivative. Formylation with alkoxide and methyl formate leads to the 2-hydroxymethyl derivative. Reaction of this last with hydroxylamine leads to formation of an isoxazole ring. There is then obtained azastene.

See also
 Cyanoketone

References

3β-Hydroxysteroid dehydrogenase inhibitors
Androstanes
Isoxazoles